Sander Arends and Tristan-Samuel Weissborn were the defending champions but chose not to defend their title.

Jeevan Nedunchezhiyan and Franko Škugor won the title after defeating Rameez Junaid and Lukáš Rosol 6–3, 6–2 in the final.

Seeds

Draw

References
 Main Draw

Prosperita Open - Doubles
2017 Doubles